HEPL may refer to:
Haute École de la Province de Liège, group of three colleges in Belgium
Hansen Experimental Physics Laboratory, research lab at Stanford University, United States